HMHS Lanfranc was a Booth Line passenger steamship that was built in Scotland in 1907 and operated scheduled services between Liverpool and Brazil until 1914. In the First World War she was a hospital ship until a U-boat sank her in the English Channel in 1917.

This was the second Lanfranc in Booth's fleet. The first was an iron-hulled steamship that was built in 1884, sold in 1898 and renamed Olympia.

Building
Booth's operated scheduled cargo liner and passenger services between Europe and Brazil. In the first decade of the 20th century these services included regular sailings between Liverpool and Manaus,  up the Amazon River. A Booth passenger ship would leave Liverpool for Manaus on or about the 10th, 20th and 30th day of each month.

Lanfranc was the first Booth ship with twin screws. Each screw was driven by a three-cylinder triple-expansion engine.

The Caledon Shipbuilding & Engineering Company of Dundee built Lanfranc for £122,000. She was launched on 18 October 1906 and completed in February 1907. She was registered in Liverpool. Her UK official number was 124034 and her code letters were HKDM.

Lanfranc was joined by two sister ships. R&W Hawthorn, Leslie and Company launched Antony on 11 November 1906 and completed her in February 1907. Caledon Shipbuilding and Engineering launched  on 31 March 1908 and completed her that August.

She and her sisters were the largest ships in Booth's fleet until Scotts Shipbuilding and Engineering Company launched Hildebrand in 1911.

By 1913 Lanfranc had a wireless telegraphy installation aboard, operated by the Marconi Company. Her call sign was MDS.

First World War service and loss
By September 1914 the British Admiralty had requisitioned several Booth ships, including Lanfranc and her sisters. Lanfranc was converted into a hospital ship with capacity for 403 wounded.

The Hague Conventions protected hospital ships in wartime. They were painted white, with a broad green waistband and large red crosses. At night they were fully lit, unlike all other ships of the belligerent powers, which were blacked out. However, in the First World War the Central Powers attacked a number of hospital ships, so by 1917 Allied hospital ships were sailing blacked out and with naval escorts.

On 17 April 1917 Lanfranc and an "ambulance ship", embarked wounded personnel at Le Havre to take to England. Lanfranc embarked 234 British and 167 German wounded and departed for Southampton. 326 of the wounded were bed-ridden, many of them with serious wounds including fractured femurs and amputations.

Royal Navy patrol vessels rescued survivors, including 152 of the German wounded.

On the same night  sank Donegal, killing 40 of the people aboard.

See also
 List of hospital ships sunk in World War I

References

Bibliography
 
 
 

1906 ships
Hospital ships in World War I
Maritime incidents in 1917
Ocean liners of the United Kingdom
Ships built in Dundee
Ships of the Booth Steamship Company
Ships sunk by German submarines in World War I
Steamships of the United Kingdom
World War I shipwrecks in the English Channel